Farha Mather (born 17 September 1996) is an Indian female badminton player.

Achievements

BWF International Challenge/Series
Women's Doubles

 BWF International Challenge tournament
 BWF International Series tournament
 BWF Future Series tournament

References

External links
 

Living people
1996 births
Indian female badminton players
20th-century Indian women
21st-century Indian women